The Ford Fiesta Rally4 is a rally car developed and built by M-Sport to Group Rally4 regulations and designed for competition in the fourth tier of the Rally Pyramid. It is based upon the Ford Fiesta road car and is the updated version of the Ford Fiesta R2.

Competition history
In addition to the junior support category of the World Rally Championship, the car is also one of the Rally4 cars available for competition in the European Rally Championship.

Rally victories

World championships

Junior World Rally Championship

Regional championships

European Rally Championship-3

References

External links

 
 Ford Fiesta Rally4 at eWRC-results.com

Ford Fiesta
Ford Rally Sport vehicles
Rally4 cars